Double Wedding is a 1937 American romantic comedy film starring William Powell and Myrna Loy, and featuring Florence Rice, John Beal, Jessie Ralph, and Edgar Kennedy. This was the seventh pairing of Powell and Loy, with another seven to go. It was directed by Richard Thorpe from a screenplay by Jo Swerling based on the unpublished play Nagy szerelem ("Great Love") by Ferenc Molnár.
 
William Powell's fiancée Jean Harlow died during production, halting filming. Powell later described finishing the film as "very difficult under the circumstances". Myrna Loy, who had been good friends with Harlow, wrote in her autobiography that she disliked the film because of Harlow's death and that it was "the scapegoat for concurrent despair".

Plot
Charles Lodge (William Powell), a free-spirited bohemian who lives in a cluttered car trailer, disrupts the well-ordered life of successful, hardworking businesswoman Margit Agnew (Myrna Loy) when he convinces her younger sister Irene (Florence Rice) that she should become an actress. However, Margit is determined that Irene marry the fiancé she (and her mother before) had personally picked out for her sister, the pliable, weak-willed cousin Waldo (John Beal).

Fed up with Waldo's lack of initiative during a four-year engagement, Irene becomes infatuated with Charles. He pretends to return her feelings so he can stay close to Margit. When Margit confronts him, he agrees to never see Irene again if Margit will let him paint her portrait. She reluctantly agrees to three weeks of sittings. As they spend time together, she begins to respond to his decidedly unconventional charms. Meanwhile, Charles tries to teach Waldo to stand up for himself so that he can regain Irene's regard, but with little luck.

When Irene shows up unexpectedly at his trailer, Charles gets her to leave, but she is spotted by Margit. Believing he lied about giving Irene up, she angrily smashes the painting over his head. Charles arranges for a wedding, ostensibly to marry Irene, but actually as a ploy to simultaneously reconcile Irene and Waldo and win Margit's hand. However, Waldo is nowhere to be seen when Charles is asked if he will take Irene for his wife. He is forced to answer no, and that he is really in love with Margit. She finally admits she loves him too. A drunk Waldo then shows up, punches Charles in the nose and carries a delighted Irene off.

Cast

Production
Double Wedding had the working title of Three's Company. Originally, Robert Young, and Robert Benchley were to have roles in the film, which was the seventh pairing of Powell and Loy. Loy's previous film, Parnell (1937) did not do well at the box office, so MGM paired her with Powell again to rehabilitate her career. The move was a success, and Double Wedding was a box office success.

When Jean Harlow, William Powell's girlfriend of three years and fiancée, died suddenly on June 7, 1937, three weeks after falling ill with uremic poisoning caused by kidney failure, production on the film was partially shut down. Her death was a blow to both Powell and Loy, a good friend of Harlow, and Powell's grief was such that he asked the studio for some time to recover. Although filming was completed on schedule, neither Powell nor Loy felt they were at their best.

Film locations included Carmel-by-the-Sea and the estate of C. A. Noble, a banker and manufacturer from Milwaukee.

References

External links

1937 films
1937 romantic comedy films
American romantic comedy films
American screwball comedy films
American black-and-white films
1930s English-language films
American films based on plays
Films about weddings
Films based on works by Ferenc Molnár
Films directed by Richard Thorpe
Films with screenplays by Jo Swerling
Films produced by Joseph L. Mankiewicz
Metro-Goldwyn-Mayer films
Films scored by Edward Ward (composer)
1930s American films